Little Fish Lake Provincial Park  is a provincial park in Alberta, Canada, located  east of Drumheller on the shore of Little Fish Lake.

It was established on April 8, 1957, and is maintained by Alberta Tourism, Parks and Recreation.

Activities

Camping is available in the park in the "Little Fish Lake" overnight camping ground.

See also
List of provincial parks in Alberta
List of Canadian provincial parks
List of Canadian national parks

References

External links

Provincial parks of Alberta
Special Area No. 2